Oesch is a surname of Swiss German origin, being a cognate of the surname Esch. Notable people with the surname include:

Karl Lennart Oesch (1892-1978), Finnish general
Tom Oesch (born 1980), Swiss filmmaker

See also
Oesch's die Dritten, a Yodel Volksmusik family group from Switzerland
Esch (surname)
Eash